Souda, alternative spelling Suda, can refer to:
Souda, a town on the coast of Crete, Greece
Souda Bay, a bay and natural harbour in Crete, near the town of the same name
Souda Bay Naval Base, a naval base in Crete in the bay of the same name
Souda Island, an island in the bay of the same name
Chania International Airport, an airport on the Akrotiri peninsula near Souda Bay
Souda, Senegal, a village in Senegal
Souda (company), an American design studio that specializes in furniture, lighting, and home decor
The Suda, a 10th-century Byzantine dictionary and encyclopedia
Goichi Suda, "Suda51"; video game director
Sudas, ancient Indian king